Andrew's Dole is an English custom dating from 1605. In that year, the Mayor of Bideford (in the county of Devon), Andrew Dole, established a trust to provide for loaves of bread to be distributed to poor, elderly, persons who applied at the Mayor's Parlour. The custom continues to this day and takes place on New Year's Day. He also left some land to trustees and the income is  distributed to 10 deserving people, for each trustee. Again this is distributed on New Year's Day.

References

A Companion to the Folklore, Myths & Customs of Britain. Author, Marc Alexander. Published by Sutton Publishing Limited, 2002.

British folklore
Bideford
Culture in Devon